The 2004–05 PFF National League (now known as PFF League) was the 1st season of second tier of Pakistan Football Federation. The season was scheduled to start on 22 November 2004 and concluded on 1 February 2005. The league's name was originally planned as National League Division B.

Groups

Northern

Southern

Final Round

References 

Pakistan Football Federation League seasons
PFF
Pakistan